Alberto Goldman (12 October 1937 – 1 September 2019) was a Brazilian engineer and politician. He was elected Vice Governor of São Paulo in 2006 with Governor José Serra. After Serra's resignation, Goldman became governor of São Paulo on 6 April 2010.

Personal life

Goldman began studying engineering at the Polytechnic School of the University of São Paulo when he was 18. When the 1964 Brazilian coup d'état took place, he was a militant of the Brazilian Communist Party (PCB). Soon after the AI-5, he became a member of the Brazilian Democratic Movement (MDB).

After the end of the MDB in the late 1970s, he became a member of the Brazilian Democratic Movement Party (PMDB). He went back to PCB but ended up leaving it for PMDB in 1987. From 1992-1994, he served as the Transport Minister during the presidency of Itamar Franco. In 1996, he left PMDB and became a member of PSDB and was elected a federal deputy two years later.

He served as governor of the state of São Paulo from April 2010 to January 2011, replacing José Serra who resigned from office in order to run for the presidency in 2010, and was succeeded by the current governor Geraldo Alckmin.

He served as acting National President and National Vice President of the Brazilian Social Democracy Party. He replaced senator Aécio Neves, who was the candidate of the party in the 2014 race for the presidency.

After complications caused by surgery to treat heart disease, Goldman died on 1 September 2019 in Sírio Libanês Hospital, in São Paulo.

References

1937 births
2019 deaths
Governors of São Paulo (state)
Vice Governors of São Paulo (state)
University of São Paulo alumni
Government ministers of Brazil
People from São Paulo
Brazilian Communist Party politicians
Brazilian Democratic Movement politicians
Brazilian communists
Brazilian engineers
Jewish Brazilian politicians
Brazilian people of Polish-Jewish descent